William Willis Wiley Wood (May 30, 1818 – August 31, 1882) was an engineer of the United States Navy, who served as Engineer-in-Chief of the Bureau of Steam Engineering from 1873 until 1877.

Biography 
Wood was born in Wake County, North Carolina, and after graduation obtained a position at the West Point Foundry.

He was appointed to the Navy from New York on March 15, 1845, with the rank of chief engineer. He spent his first two years in the navy stationed at the Pensacola Navy Yard, Florida. He briefly did special duty at Boston, and then from 1850 to 1853, served on the paddle-sloop  in the Home Squadron.

From 1854 to 1857, Wood superintended the constructions of the engines of the screw-frigate  at Cold Spring, New York. His next appointment was for two years serving in the screw-sloop  on the Pacific Squadron. From 1862 to 1866, Wood spent most of his time on special duty in Philadelphia, New York and Boston. Wood was assigned to the United States Naval Academy from 1866 to 1867. Wood was Inspector of Machinery Afloat in New York from 1870 to 1872.

Wood was promoted to engineer-in-chief in 1872, and was appointed Chief of the Bureau of Steam Engineering on March 20, 1873, his successor was appointed on March 3, 1877. Wood was assigned to special duty in 1878, and was placed on the retired list on May 31, 1880.

Death 

On August 31, 1882, Wood was drowned in a boating accident off Point Lookout, Maryland. He was buried at Oak Hill Cemetery in Washington, D.C.

Family 
At the time of his death, Wood was married and had six children:
 Fanny Henderson, wife of Lt. Conway Hillyer Arnold, USN
 Mary Eliza, wife of Lt. Eugene DeForest Heald, USN
 Leiley Weir, wife of Lt. Charles Allston Stone, USN
 Lt. Thomas Newton Wood, USN
 Emily Grace, wife of Lt. Henry Frick Reich, USN
 Master Francis Gregory Wood

Two more, William Willis Wood and Charles Gillespie Wood, had died young.

See also

References

External links 
 
 William W. W. Wood papers at the University of Maryland libraries

1818 births
1882 deaths
Accidental deaths in Maryland
Boating accident deaths
Burials at Oak Hill Cemetery (Washington, D.C.)
United States Navy engineering officers
People from Wake County, North Carolina
People of North Carolina in the American Civil War
Union Navy officers